The Czechoslovak myth is a negationist narrative that Czechoslovakia between 1918 and 1938 was a tolerant and liberal democratic country, oriented towards Western Europe, and free of antisemitism compared to other countries in central and eastern Europe. For example, the country was described as "a welcoming and tolerant place for Jews," and an "island of democracy in Eastern Europe".  

Jewish aspect
The alleged architects of the myth were Tomáš Garrigue Masaryk and Edvard Beneš. Tatjana Lichtenstein notes that these politicians were "often depicted as tolerant, progressive, and politically sophisticated strategists bestowing rights on 'their' Jews". However, Masaryk endorsed antisemitic theories about Jewish control of the press, writing to Beneš in October 1918: "Hilsner helped us a lot now: Zionists and other Jews have publicly accepted our programme." Beneš refused to sign a treaty guaranteeing minority rights to Czechoslovak Jews because he declared it to be a form of defamation against Czechoslovakia. When Jewish activists pressed the issue, Beneš referred to increasing antisemitism in Czechoslovakia and warned that further demands could "provoke renewed recriminations from one side or the other". The myth of Czechoslovak exceptionalism was promoted in polemic fashion and exploited for political gain by Czechoslovak politicians from the Paris Peace Conference after World War I, throughout the First Czechoslovak Republic and the Czechoslovak government-in-exile, and in the Third Czechoslovak Republic until the 1948 Communist coup.  Jan Láníček emphasizes the importance of a 1930 issue of the Jewish Daily Bulletin, dedicated to Masaryk and featuring praise from American Jewish leaders Stephen Samuel Wise  and Felix Frankfurter, as well as the Zionist Vladimir Jabotinsky and American vice president Charles Curtis, especially for Masaryk's support for Zionism.

"Masaryk cult"
According to Andrea Orzoff the "Masaryk cult", an element in the Czechoslovak myth, exaggerates the importance and positive qualities of Masaryk, while downplaying the role that domestic resistance played in securing Czechoslovak independence. However, historians disagree on whether "cult of personality" is the right term, noting the differences between Masaryk and Joseph Stalin.

Historicity
Orzoff notes that "all successful myths incorporate elements of generally recognized truth": Czechoslovakia was the last central European state to retain its democracy, up until 1938; its minorities enjoyed greater protections than in other countries; and Czechoslovakia was in many respects closer to Western Europe than its neighbors. She does not intend the term "myth" to be pejorative: "Rather, the term “myth” helps highlight the essentialist, fabulistic narrative underscoring political and academic discourse on the “natively democratic” Czechs and Czechoslovakia since 1918". However, the narrative is inconsistent with some events in Czechoslovak history, such as antisemitic violence between 1918 and 1920.

References

Sources

Further reading

History of Czechoslovakia
Historiography of Europe
Antisemitism in the Czech Republic
Antisemitism in Slovakia
Czech nationalism